CTPS may refer to: 
 The enzyme CTP synthase, or either of the two CTPS genes:
 CTPS (1p34.1) 
 CTPS2 (Xp22)
 The Central Transportation Planning Staff of the Boston Region Metropolitan Planning Organization.